Alfred Chester (September 7, 1928 – August 1, 1971) was an American writer known for his provocative, experimental work, including the novels Jamie Is My Heart's Desire and The Exquisite Corpse and the short story collection Behold Goliath.

Early life 
Chester was born in Flatbush in Brooklyn, New York. X-rays used to treat childhood illness left him bald, and he wore a wig, which though noticeable was not something that people felt comfortable mentioning. He was educated at Orthodox Jewish yeshiva. He attended New York University where he met fellow writers Cynthia Ozick (who later wrote about him in her book Fame & Folly), Sol Yurick and Edward Field (who wrote "The Man Who Would Marry Susan Sontag" which has many chapters dedicated to the biography and literary career of Alfred Chester).

Career 
He attended graduate school at Columbia University but dropped out.  He lived in France for most of the 1950s as an openly gay man. In 1952 his essay "Silence in Heaven" was published in Marguerite Caetani's literary review Botteghe oscure. (Caetani was the U.S.-born wife of an Italian nobleman.)
Chester wrote a pornographic novel, Chariot of Flesh, for Olympia Press, using the pseudonym Malcolm Nesbit.

His first collection of short stories, Here Be Dragons, was published in 1955.  His novel Jamie Is My Heart's Desire was initially published in a French translation, then in an English edition by the British publisher André Deutsch, and only later appeared in the United States. With Caetani's support, he received a Guggenheim Fellowship in 1957. His short story "As I Was Going Up the Stair" was included in Best American Short Stories.

Starting in 1959, his short fiction was published in magazines such as The New Yorker, Esquire, and Transatlantic Review. His literary criticism appeared in the New York Review of Books, Partisan Review, and Commentary. He returned to the United States and met Susan Sontag through Harriet Sohmers and María Irene Fornés.

Chester moved to Morocco in 1963. His short story collection Behold Goliath was published in 1964, and his novel The Exquisite Corpse was published in 1967. He associated with Paul Bowles and Jane Bowles while in Morocco, but eventually fell out with both of them.

Later life 
Increasingly, his behavior was made erratic by a combination of mental illness and drug use. It is uncertain if he was ever formally diagnosed, but based on his symptoms, he is believed to have suffered from paranoid schizophrenia, the first symptoms of which he displayed in 1958 at age 30 at the MacDowell Artists Colony in New Hampshire. He died in Israel in 1971. His later writing was published posthumously in collections such as Looking for Genet.

References

External links
Alfred Chester collection at the Harry Ransom Center at the University of Texas at Austin
Alfred Chester letters to Curtis Harnack held by Special Collections, University of Delaware Library
Edward Field Alfred Chester archives held by Special Collections, University of Delaware Library

1928 births
1971 deaths
People from Flatbush, Brooklyn
Writers from Brooklyn
American gay writers
LGBT Jews
20th-century American LGBT people
20th-century American novelists
20th-century American short story writers
20th-century American male writers
American male novelists
American male short story writers
American LGBT novelists